Benjamin Husband was a British stage actor of the eighteenth century. His surname is sometimes written as Husbands.

Reportedly born in Pembrokeshire in 1672, he was a member of the Lincolns Inn Fields and Drury Lane companies during the 1700s. He was later in Dublin as part of the Smock Alley Theatre organisation. When he had a benefit there in 1746, he was described as the oldest living actor.

Selected roles
 Tyranges in The Double Distress by Mary Pix (1701)
 Zama in Tamerlane by Nicholas Rowe (1702)
 Alphonso in All for the Better by Francis Manning (1702)
 Richemore in The Twin Rivals by George Farquhar (1702)
 Lorenzo in The Patriot by Charles Gildon (1702)
 Don Philip in She Would and She Would Not by Colley Cibber (1702)
 Albovade in The Faithful Bride of Granada by William Taverner (1704)
 Viceroy in The Revolution of Sweden by Catharine Cockburn (1706)
 Bellmour in Adventures in Madrid by Mary Pix (1706)
 Offa in The Royal Convert by Nicholas Rowe (1707)
 Lovely in The Man's Bewitched by Susanna Centlivre (1709)
 Valerius in Appius and Virginia by John Dennis (1709)
 Catesby in Jane Shore by Nicholas Rowe (1714)

References

Bibliography
 Highfill, Philip H, Burnim, Kalman A. & Langhans, Edward A. A Biographical Dictionary of Actors, Actresses, Musicians, Dancers, Managers, and Other Stage Personnel in London, 1660-1800: Volume VIII. SIU Press, 1978.

18th-century English people
English male stage actors
British male stage actors
18th-century English male actors
18th-century British male actors
1672 births